Bastien is a name of French origin. It is a variant of Sebastian. The name may refer to:

People

Given name
 Bastien Auzeil (born 1989), French decathlon athlete
 Bastien Bernard (born 1976), French football midfielder
 Bastien Bouillon, French actor
 Bastien Chesaux (born 1991), Swiss motorcycle racer
 Bastien Coriton (born 1981), French politician
 Bastien Damiens (1995–2015), French slalom canoeist
 Bastien Fuster (born 1992), French rugby union player
 Bastien Geiger (born 1985), Swiss football right back
 Bastien Héry (born 1992), French football midfielder
 Bastien Lecouffe-Deharme (born 1982), French visual artist and novelist
 Bastien Midol (born 1990), French freestyle skier
 Bastien Pagez (16th century), French servant and musician at the court of Mary, Queen of Scots
 Bastien Salabanzi (born 1985), French skateboarder
 Bastien Vivès (born 1984), French comic book artist

Surname
 Alfred Bastien (1873–1955), Belgian artist, academic and soldier
 Baz Bastien (1919–1983), Canadian ice hockey player and coach
 Benoît Bastien (born 1983), French football referee
 Cath Bastien (born 1994), Canadian social media personality and bikini model
 Cléophas Bastien (1892–1943), Canadian provincial politician
 Bastien Colin (born 1966), Great Britain International Discus Thrower, Fullback at the University of Miami
 Frédéric Bastien, Canadian author, historian, and journalist
 Jean Bastien (1915–1969), French football midfielder
 Jean Bastien-Thiry (1927–1963), French engineer who tried to assassinate de Gaulle
 Jephté Bastien, Canadian film director
 Kely Bastien, Haitian politician, president of the Senate of Haiti
 Louis Bastien (disambiguation), multiple people, including:
Louis Bastien (cyclist) (1881–1963), French Olympic road racing bicyclist
Louis Bastien (Esperantist) (1869–1961), French military officer and Esperantist
 Pierre Bastien (born 1953), French musician, composer, and instrument builder
 Red Bastien (born 1931), American professional wrestler
 Samuel Bastien (born 1996), Belgian football midfielder
 Steve Bastien (cricketer) (born 1963), English cricketer
 Steve Bastien (athlete) (born 1994), American decathlete

See also
Bastien River, a tributary of Faillon Lake in Quebec, Canada
Bastien und Bastienne, one-act comic opera with music by Mozart
Bastien Range, mountain range in Antarctica

French masculine given names
French-language surnames